Jaida Jones is an American author. Their most prominent work is the 2008 fantasy novel Havemercy, co-written with Danielle Bennett.

Biography
Jones attended Saint Ann's School from kindergarten through high school. They later studied East Asian languages and cultures at Barnard College. Before becoming a published author, Jones co-wrote a Harry Potter fan fiction story called "The Shoebox Project" which gained a massive following online. It was during this time that Jones met Danielle Bennett in a LiveJournal thread and the two started writing a novel together. The resulting novel, Havemercy, was picked up by Random House for an advance of $30,000 and published in 2008.

In March 2019, Jones and Bennett announced they had sold another book, Master of One, a young adult (YA) fantasy which was published by HarperTeen in November 2020.

Bibliography

Poetry
 Cinquefoil (as Hannah Jones) (2006, New Babel Books)

The Volstovic Cycle
 Havemercy (2008, Spectra)
 Shadow Magic (2009, Spectra)
 Dragon Soul (2010, Spectra)
 Steelhands (2011, Spectra)

Other novels
 Master of One (2020, HarperTeen)

References

External links
 
 

21st-century American novelists
21st-century American women writers
American fantasy writers
American women novelists
Barnard College alumni
Living people
Saint Ann's School (Brooklyn) alumni
Women science fiction and fantasy writers
Year of birth missing (living people)